The Rogue Invitational is an annual sporting event that includes a CrossFit competition and a strongman competition.  The event, organized by Rogue, started in 2019 as a CrossFit sanctioned competition, but has since become a major competition for CrossFit athletes. A contest for strongmen that featured the largest prize purse in the history of strongman competition was added in 2021.

History
The Rogue Invitational was announced in November 2018 as a sanctioned CrossFit event for the 2019 CrossFit Games. For the first Invitational, the top 10 male and top 10 female athletes from the 2018 CrossFit Games were given an invitation, as well as online qualifiers and other select top athletes making a total of 20 men, 20 women and 10 teams invited.  The prize purse was $400,000, with the winners winning a top prize of $50,000 and a place at the CrossFit Games in their respective division, and all participants are guaranteed a cash prize. A Legends division was included for notable past CrossFit male and female athletes. The first Rogue Invitational also hosted the Rogue Record Breakers whereby strongmen and strongwomen can attempt to break 4 Strongman records. The competition was held at the Rogue company headquarters in Columbus, Ohio over two days in May 2019. The inaugural Invitational was contested by 19 men, 20 women and 8 teams, and it won by Mat Fraser for the men's competition, Tia-Clair Toomey for the women's, and CrossFit OC3 for the team's.  The competition was live-streamed, and Rogue partnered with CBS to broadcast edited segments of the competition after the event.

In 2020, due to the ongoing Coronavirus pandemic, the event was postponed and held online in June, to be competed by 18 men and 18 women, including top Games athletes, qualifiers (from the qualification stage now called "The Q") and invitees. No team competition was held this year or in subsequent years.

The third Rogue Invitational returned to live competition in 2021, which took place over three days in October at Dell Diamond near Austin, Texas. It provided a prize purse of $1.25 million at the minimum, the biggest in CrossFit outside of the CrossFit Games, and it became the only CrossFit competition that pays out to all athletes competing including airfare and accommodation. It also expanded to include a strongman contest this year, instituting the biggest prize purse in the history of strongman competition. 20 men and 20 women in CrossFit (no qualifiers this year) were invited to compete in the CrossFit competition, while the field for the strongman competition had 10 athletes including 4 WSM champions. Martins Licis was the first winner of the strongman competition at Rogue Invitational.

In 2022, 15 top male and 15 top female athletes from the CrossFit Games were invited, and at least 5 men and 5 women from the qualifier which returned this year. The competition was extended to four days this year with an extra offsite event added.

Events
The first Rogue Invitational had 8 events for individuals, 7 for teams and 4 for Legends. No team competition was held after the first year. The second featured 6 events, the third 7, the fourth 10. The programming of the events at Rogue has a bias toward strength.

The first strongman competition had five events. They include the "Wheel of Pain" created by Rogue, which is an implement inspired by the film Conan the Barbarian and the largest implement ever created for a strongman competition and first used in the Arnold Strongman Classic.  Other events included the Rogue-created Elephant Bar for max deadlift and Stone Over Hitching Post. Six events were scheduled over two days in the second strongman competition, with three events repeated from the first competition:  Cyr Dumbbell Ladder, Yoke Carry & Overhead Log Lift Medley, Stone Over Hitching Post. Specially-constructed equipment include "Rogue-a-Coaster Pull" where competitors pulled 600 lbs in a cart up a slope simulating a roller coaster ramp, and "Tower of Power" that featured an elevated 900 lbs deadlift on a platform.

Winners

References

External links
 Rogue Invitational

International sports competitions hosted by the United States
CrossFit
Strongmen competitions